Cat's Eyes is the self-titled debut album by London-based alternative pop duo Cat's Eyes, released on April 11, 2011 on the Polydor record label.

The album featured the songs "Cat's Eyes" and "The Best Person I Know", which previously appeared on the group's Broken Glass EP, along with eight other tracks including "The Lull" (which the band noted was the first song they wrote for the project).

The album was dedicated to the memory of Charlie Haddon of electronica band Ou Est Le Swimming Pool, who committed suicide in August 2010 at Pukkelpop festival in Belgium. Badwan of Cat's Eyes was a friend of Haddon's, and his full-time band The Horrors played at his memorial gig in London.

Mojo placed the album at No. 13 on its list of "Top 50 albums of 2011."

Track listing

Personnel
Musicians
Faris Badwan - vocals, guitar, Vox Jaguar Organ, synthesizers
Rachel Zeffira - vocals, oboe, cor anglais, violin, viola, piano, vibraphone, harmonium, Vox Jaguar Organ, synthesizers

Production
Joe Jones - engineering
Steve Osborne - production, engineering
Tom Dalgety - engineering
Andrew Dudman - orchestra engineering,
Kevin Metclafe - mastering

References

2011 debut albums
Cat's Eyes albums
Polydor Records albums
Albums produced by Steve Osborne